Harold van Beek (born 14 April 1962) is a Dutch racewalker. He competed in the men's 50 kilometres walk at the 1992 Summer Olympics.

References

1962 births
Living people
Athletes (track and field) at the 1992 Summer Olympics
Dutch male racewalkers
Olympic athletes of the Netherlands
Sportspeople from Eindhoven